Qudāma ibn Jaʿfar al-Kātib al-Baghdādī (c. 873 – c. 932/948), was a Syriac scholar and administrator for the Abbasid Caliphate.

Life

Little is known with certainty about Qudama's life and work. He was probably born ca. 873/874, possibly at Basra. His grandfather was a Syriac Christian. Whether it was his grandfather, or he himself, who converted to Islam under Muktafi bi-Allah in ca. 902–908 is unclear. Ibn al-Nadim described him as a master of literary style, a polished writer and distinguished philosopher of Logic despite having an uneducated father.
He held various junior administrative positions in the caliphal secretariat in Baghdad, and eventually rose to a senior post the treasury department. Various dates for his death have been supplied, ranging from 932 to 939/940 and 948.

Works
Of his several books on philosophy, history, philology, and administration, only three survive:
 the Kitab al-Kharaj ( -the Book of the Land Tax, in full form Book of the Land Tax and the Art of the Secretary), for which Qudama is chiefly known. The last four sections of the original eight, survives.  It was written after 928 as a manual for administrators, and deals with the structure of the state and the army, as well with geographic details, including valuable accounts on the Caliphate's neighbours, especially the Byzantine Empire. It also included a now lost section on literary rhetoric.
 the Kitab al-Alfaz (Book of Words) or Jawahir al-Alfaz (Jewels of Words), a compilation of synonyms and phrases for the use of poets and orators, as well as containing an introduction on the figures of speech.
 the Kitab Naqd al-Shi'r ( -Book on Poetic Criticism), an essay and guide on composing good poetry.
 The Cleanser ("Sabun" or "soap")of Sorrow
 Dismissal of Anxiety
 Epistle about Abu 'Ali ibn Muqlah known as "The Brilliant Star"
 Withstanding Grief
 Wines of Thought
 Book of Unconsciousness
 Book of Politics
 Refutation of Ibn al-Mu'tazz
 The Pleasure of Hearts and the Provision of the Traveller
To Ibn Jaʿfar was once also attributed the Naqd al-nathr, now known to be the Kitāb al-Burhān fī wujūh al-bayān of Ibrāhīm ibn Wahb al-Kātib.

Notes

References

Sources

 
 
 
 
 

870s births
10th-century deaths
Year of birth uncertain
Year of death uncertain
9th-century geographers
9th-century scholars
9th-century writers
10th-century Iranian geographers
10th-century scholars
10th-century writers
Officials of the Abbasid Caliphate
Arab geographers
Scholars from the Abbasid Caliphate
Arabists
People from Basra
Syriac writers
Converts to Islam from Christianity
10th-century people from the Abbasid Caliphate
9th-century people
10th-century people